Geoffrey Eric Molson  (born July 23, 1971), is a  Canadian businessman and current president and chief executive officer and co-owner of the National Hockey League's Montreal Canadiens, Evenko, Bell Centre and L'Équipe Spectra alongside his brothers Andrew Molson and Justin Molson. He is a member of the Molson family. He is also the Honorary Colonel of the Royal Military College Saint-Jean, in Quebec, Canada. Molson was made a knight of the National Order of Quebec in 2019 and a member of the Order of Canada in 2021.

Early life and education
Molson, the son of Eric Molson and Jane M. Molson, was born and raised in Montreal where he attended Selwyn House School and Lower Canada College.

Molson holds a Bachelor of Arts from St. Lawrence University in Canton, New York, and a Master of Business Administration from Babson College in Wellesley, Massachusetts.

References

1971 births
Living people
Babson College alumni
Businesspeople from Montreal
Canadian sports businesspeople
Geoff Molson
Montreal Canadiens executives
National Hockey League executives
National Hockey League owners
St. Lawrence University alumni